The following is a list of awards and nominations received by Martin Sheen throughout his acting career.  1965 Nominated for Tony Award for The Subject Was Roses

By film or TV series

References

Sheen, Martin